Valentine Square, also known as the Alexander-Collins House, is a historic house in Winchester, Tennessee, U.S.. It was built in 1899 by Franklin Pierce McDowell for Smith Morgan Alexander, a banker who had served in the Confederate States Army during the American Civil War. It was named Valentine Square for his daughter.

The house was designed in the Stick/eastlake architectural style. It has been listed on the National Register of Historic Places since November 8, 1984.

References

National Register of Historic Places in Franklin County, Tennessee
Queen Anne architecture in Tennessee
Houses completed in 1899